PSR J1903+0327 is a millisecond pulsar in a highly eccentric binary orbit.
 
The pulsar was discovered in an ongoing L-band (1.4 GHz) survey with the 305 m diameter Arecibo radio telescope.

The pulse period is 2.15 ms, or 465.1 times per second.  Analysis of the pulse timing residuals shows a binary orbit with a period of 95.17 days, and a high eccentricity, e = 0.437.  The mass of the companion is ~1 solar mass, while the pulsar mass is unusually large at 1.67 ± 0.02 ; the third largest precisely measured mass after those of PSR J1614−2230 and PSR J0348+0432.  A near-infrared companion, KS = 18 (2.22µ), is observed in Gemini North images at its radio position, in 2011 radial velocity measurements made with the VLT confirmed this to be the companion to the millisecond pulsar; the first such system to be observed in the Galaxy.

Popular theories for the formation of binary millisecond pulsars require mass transfer onto the rotating neutron star from a white dwarf companion in order to spin it up to periods less than about 10 ms—a process expected to be accompanied by strong tidal forces, producing a highly circular orbit. The main-sequence companion and the eccentric orbit of PSR J1903+0327 do not conform to this expectation. The system is likely to have originated as a triple system. The remnant of the star that transferred mass to the neutron star (its original close companion) was later ejected by a gravitational interaction with the unevolved third member of the system; its present main-sequence companion.

References

Aquila (constellation)
Binary stars
Pulsars